Charles Adams Mosher (May 7, 1906 – November 16, 1984) was an American newspaperman and politician who served eight terms as a Republican member of the United States House of Representatives from Ohio from 1961 to 1977.

Early life and career 
Charles Adams Mosher was born in Sandwich, Illinois.  He graduated from Sandwich High School, and Oberlin College in 1928.  He was employed on daily newspapers in Aurora, Illinois, and Janesville, Wisconsin, from 1929 to 1940.  He was president and manager of the Oberlin Printing Company and editor-publisher of the Oberlin News-Tribune, 1940-1961.  He was vice chairman of Oberlin City Council, 1945-1951.

He was a member of the Ohio State Senate from 1951 to 1960, a member of Ohio Legislative Service Commission from 1947 to 1959, and vice chairman of the Ohio School Survey Commission from 1954 to 1955.  He was a delegate to the White House Conference on Education in 1955, director of the Oberlin Improvement and Development Corporation and a member of Presidential Commission on Marine Science, Engineering and Resources, 1967-1969. In 1961 he was listed as being on the Committee on Science and Astronautics. Chaired by Overton Brooks, and therefore a contributor to what has now become popularly known as the 'Brookings Report' (1961). The report dealt with the long term implications for American Society of Space Exploration.

Congress 
Mosher was elected as a Republican to the Eighty-seventh and to the seven succeeding Congresses.  He was not a candidate for re-election in 1976 to the Ninety-fifth Congress.

Later career and death 
In 1977, he was elected to the Common Cause National Governing Board. He was the executive director of the House Science and Technology Committee in Washington, D.C., September 1977 – 1979.  He was a fellow of the Woodrow Wilson Center at the Smithsonian Institution in 1980.  He received his M.A. from Oberlin College in 1982.  He was a resident of Oberlin, Ohio, until his death on November 16, 1984, at the age of 78.

Bibliography
Mosher, Charles Adams. Reinterpreting Congress and Its Works; A Speculative Theory Essayed: The Reflections, Confessions and Credo of Charles Adams Mosher. Oberlin, OH: C. A. Mosher, 1984.

Sources

The Political Graveyard

1906 births
1984 deaths
20th-century American politicians
20th-century American newspaper editors
Editors of Ohio newspapers
Oberlin College alumni
Ohio city council members
Republican Party Ohio state senators
People from Oberlin, Ohio
People from Sandwich, Illinois
Republican Party members of the United States House of Representatives from Ohio